Cylindropuntia fulgida, the jumping cholla, also known as the hanging chain cholla, is a cholla cactus native to Sonora and the Southwestern United States.

The greatest range of the jumping cholla is the entirety of Sonora, except the Sierra Madre Occidental cordillera on the east and northern California, including the major islands of Tiburon and Isla Ángel de la Guarda.

In the Southwestern United States, the range extends into the Colorado Desert of California, and in Arizona. There it occurs south and southwest of the Arizona transition zone of the Mogollon Rim; in the northwest-central Sonoran Desert of Arizona, it is in a few selected locales. It also reaches into the northeast section of the Mojave Desert in southern Nevada and Utah, and in the very southern section of the Great Basin Desert of southern Utah. It also occurs just south of the east-west section of the Bill Williams River, east of the Colorado River in the Yuma Desert, and in parts of the Eastern Plains of Colorado.

Description 
While the name "jumping cholla" is applied especially to this species, it is also used as a general term for all chollas.

The jumping cholla is an arborescent (tree-like) plant with one low-branching trunk. Together, the plants form fantastic looking forests that may range over many hectares.

Leaves have been reduced to spines, 6 to 12 of which grow from each areole. Young branches are covered with  silvery-yellow spines, which darken to a gray color with age. These spines form a dense layer that obscures the stems. Slower growing or older branches have sparse and/or shorter spines. As the spines fall off of older parts, the brown-black bark is revealed. It becomes rough and scaly with age.

Flowers are white and pink, streaked with lavender. According to  naturalists/writers  Henry and Rebecca Northen, a curiosity of these flowers is that C. fulgida opens its flowers at exactly 3:00p.m. solar time, and can be used to set one's watch.  

Most of the fleshy, green fruits are sterile, pear-shaped to nearly round, wrinkled with a few spines. It is these hanging chains of fruit which give it the name "hanging chain cholla".

Name

The "jumping cholla" name comes from the ease with which the stems detach when brushed. Often the merest touch will leave a person with bits of cactus hanging on their clothes to be discovered later when either sitting or leaning on them. The ground around a mature plant will often be covered with dead stems, and young plants are started from stems that have fallen from the adult. They attach themselves to desert animals and are dispersed for short distances. Extinct, hairy megafauna may have played a role in their historic, more widespread dispersal in this manner.

Other names for this cactus include chain fruit cholla, cholla brincadora, and velas de coyote.

Wildlife

During droughts, animals like the bighorn sheep and some deer species like the desert mule deer, rely on the juicy fruit for food and water. Because they grow in inaccessible and hostile places of the desert, populations of this cactus are stable. Cactus wren are also known to nest in jumping cholla.

References

External links
 Blueplanetbiomes.org: Chain fruit cholla
 Delange.org: Jumping cholla
 Cylindropuntia fulgida photo gallery at Opuntia Web
 Flora of North America @ efloras.org: Cylindropuntia fulgida (Chain-fruit cholla)

fulgida
Cacti of Mexico
Cacti of the United States
Flora of the California desert regions
Flora of the Sonoran Deserts
Flora of Arizona
Flora of Baja California
Flora of New Mexico
Flora of Northwestern Mexico
Flora without expected TNC conservation status